Martina Dalić (born 12 November 1967) is a Croatian economist and finance official who was a Deputy Prime Minister of Croatia and Minister of Economy, Small and Medium Entrepreneurship and Crafts in the Cabinet of Andrej Plenković.

She was the first female Minister of Economy in Croatia (excluding Tamara Obradović-Mazal's two-day acting tenure in 2012). She was previously Croatia's first and to date only female Minister of Finance from 29 December 2010 to 23 December 2011 in the Cabinet of Jadranka Kosor. She is a member of the centre-right Croatian Democratic Union (HDZ) and resides in Zagreb.

Early life and education 
Born Martina Štimec in Velika Gorica to a father from Letovanić and a mother from Vrlika, Dalić graduated from the University of Zagreb Faculty of Economics and Business in 1990.

Career 
Dalić was hired by the Croatian finance ministry in 1995 as the head of the macroeconomic forecasting department under Finance Minister Božo Prka. In 1997, she became assistant minister. In 2000, she left the public sector and was employed at Privredna banka Zagreb as chief economist.

After HDZ returned to power following the 2003 election, Dalić returned to the ministry in 2004 and worked at the Central State Strategy Office (Središnji državni ured za strategiju) and was the country's chief negotiator in matters pertaining to financial legislation during Croatia's European Union accession negotiations.

On 22 September 2014, Dalić left HDZ because she believed that the party did not offer a program that would bring Croatia out of the economic crisis. In an open letter she wrote: "Croatia can't handle another unprepared government which deals with itself and only stays on the surface of the problem. For me further participation in such party is impossible because I am now totally convinced that things won't change. HDZ doesn't have enough power or determination to step outside of established political patterns which reduce on a mere repetition that current Government is incompetent, on political criticism day by day and on the constant dealing with the past. The economic team of the HDZ has no coordination, no leadership, no clear direction and specific addressing the real causes of this protracted Croatian crisis."

Dalić resigned as a minister in the Cabinet of Andrej Plenković in May 2018.

Other activities
 European Bank for Reconstruction and Development (EBRD), Ex-Officio Member of the Board of Governors (2010-2011)

References

External links
Martina Dalić's profile at the Government of Croatia official website 

1967 births
Living people
20th-century Croatian economists
Croatian Democratic Union politicians
Faculty of Economics and Business, University of Zagreb alumni
Finance ministers of Croatia
People from Velika Gorica
Economy ministers of Croatia
Women government ministers of Croatia
Female finance ministers
21st-century Croatian women politicians
21st-century Croatian politicians
21st-century Croatian economists